Stone Edward Johnson (April 26, 1940 — September 8, 1963) was an Olympic sprinter and American football kick returner and running back for the Kansas City Chiefs.

On August 30, 1963, the rookie Johnson, a 200 meter track finalist in the 1960 Summer Olympics in Rome and former world record holder, suffered a fractured vertebra in his neck in a preseason game against the Houston Oilers in Wichita, Kansas during a kickoff return. He died 10 days later, on September 8, at the age of 23. Although he was only on the team's active roster during preseason, his jersey number 33 was retired.

See also
List of American Football League players

References

1940 births
1963 deaths
Track and field athletes from Dallas
Players of American football from Dallas
American football running backs
Grambling State Tigers football players
Olympic track and field athletes of the United States
Athletes (track and field) at the 1960 Summer Olympics
Kansas City Chiefs players
Sports deaths in Kansas
African-American players of American football
American male sprinters
American Football League players
Track and field athletes in the National Football League
20th-century African-American sportspeople
National Football League players with retired numbers